Circle is a 2017 South Korean science fiction television series starring Yeo Jin-goo, Kim Kang-woo, Gong Seung-yeon, and Lee Gi-kwang. The series features two parallel plots set in the years 2017 and 2037, both centered on twin brothers' struggle with the discovery and development of an advanced alien technology that could either be a boon or bane for the entire human race.

It aired on tvN for 12 episodes at 23:00 KST on Mondays and Tuesdays from May 22 to June 27, 2017.

Synopsis 
In the year 2007, before the main events of the drama, 11-year-old fraternal twin brothers Kim Woo-jin (Jung Ji-hoon) and Kim Bum-gyun (Kim Ye-joon), along with their neuroscientist father Dr. Kim Kyu-chul (Kim Joong-ki), witness the arrival of a female humanoid alien (Gong Seung-yeon). Out of pity and curiosity, the family brings the alien with them and adopts her as a member of the family. The twins become fond of her, especially Woo-jin who names her Byul. By chance, Dr. Kim discovers Byul's secret: she had brought with her an advanced form of technology that can record, and even lock, memories and convert them into video. In order to closely study this alien technology, Dr. Kim isolates himself from his family to work secretly on Byul in what he calls the "Beta Project." Dr. Kim never goes back home, making the twin Bum-gyun think Byul has taken their father captive, though Woo-jin believes their father has abandoned them.

In 2017, Woo-jin (Yeo Jin-goo), now a 21-year-old college student in neuroscience, feels that a series of suicides in his university is somehow linked to Bum-gyun (An Woo-yeon), who has been searching for aliens, particularly Byul. While in pursuit of the case, Woo-jin meets Han Jung-yeon (Gong Seung-yeon), a computer science student who, to his great shock, looks very much like Byul. She is also investigating the multiple suicides, all of which she thinks are actually murder.

In 2037, South Korea is now divided into Normal Earth, a heavily polluted place where crimes are rampant, and Smart Earth, a clean, peaceful, and crime-free city. Kim Joon-hyuk (Kim Kang-woo) is a Normal Earth crimes detective who tries to get into Smart Earth to investigate a case of twin brothers who went missing in 2017. In doing so, he starts to uncover the dark truth lurking behind Smart Earth being “crime-free.”

Each episode of the drama, except the last, contains two parts: Part 1: Beta Project, which contains a plot set in 2017, and Part 2: A Great New World, which contains a plot set in 2037. The two plots merge in the twelfth and final episode of the series, titled Circle: One World.

Cast

Main
Yeo Jin-goo as Kim Woo-jin (Beta Project) / Circulate 3 (A Great New World)
Jung Ji-hoon as young Woo-jin
a 21-year-old second-year university student in the Department of Neuroscience in Handam University of Science and Technology in the year 2017; Bum-gyun/Joon-hyuk's "younger" twin brother and son of Dr. Kim Kyu-chul
In his younger years, Woo-jin was an enthusiast about UFOs and extraterrestrial life. He witnessed (with Bum-gyun and Dr. Kim) the arrival on Earth of a female humanoid alien, which he names "Byul." His passion faded when his father disappeared with Byul. In 2017, he meets Byul (now Han Jung-yeon) once again and together they investigate the serial suicides in the university, with the help of Detective Hong Jin-hong.
Kim Kang-woo as Kim Joon-hyuk (born Kim Bum-gyun)
Ahn Woo-yeon as 21-year-old Kim Bum-gyun
Kim Ye-jun as young Bum-gyun
 (A Great New World) a 41-year-old violent crimes detective from Normal Earth in the year 2037; Woo-jin's "elder" twin brother and son of Dr. Kim Kyu-chul
Joon-hyuk enters Smart Earth to investigate cases happening within the supposedly "crime-free" city, with the help of Detective Hong Jin-hong and the alien hacker Jung-yeon a.k.a. Bluebird.  Twenty years before (as Kim Bum-gyun) he was consumed with aliens on earth and had in facat been in a psychiatric hospital and prison for his seemingly mad behaviours.  By 2017, he is investigating the series of suicide in Handam University of Science and Technology that he believed were brought about by aliens. He loses his memories later on; Detective Hong gives him his new name "Joon-hyuk" and he enters the police force.
Gong Seung-yeon as Han Jung-yeon (a.k.a. Byul, Bluebird)
a humanoid extraterrestrial being whose arrival on Earth was witnessed by the Kim twins and their father.
During her arrival in 2007, Byul appeared naked to the Kims and was also mute, having no knowledge of any human language. She becomes close to Woo-jin, who gave her the name "Byul," and she learns how to speak Korean. She is a semi-immortal being, i.e. she never ages and will look the same as long as she lives. She had brought with her an advanced form of alien technology that can record, and even lock, memories and convert them into video. She was taken for scientific research by the twins' neuroscientist father and later loses her memories. She is adopted by Professor Han Yong-woo who named her Han Jung-yeon. 
In 2037 (in A Great New World), she becomes a hacker under the codename Bluebird, based from Maurice Maeterlinck's L'oiseau bleu.
Lee Gi-kwang as Lee Ho-soo 
 (A Great New World) an intelligent 26-year-old government employee in Smart Earth in the year 2037
Ho-soo is unbelieving at first on the possibility of criminality in Smart Earth and sides with the government. He is tasked to keep watch on Joon-hyuk who is investigating cases in the "crime-free" city. Upon learning the truth from Joon-hyuk, he becomes confused, but later sides with Joon-hyuk and Bluebird to take down the unjust powers controlling Smart Earth.

Supporting

Part 1: Beta Project

People around Woo-jin 

Jung In-sun as Park Min-young
 a 21-year-old medical student who fell in love with Bum-gyun in 2017. She helped Bum-gyun, Woo-jin, Jung-yeon, and Detective Hong Jin-hong in investigating the serial suicides in the university.
 Seo Hyun-chul as Detective Hong Jin-hong
 He is a police detective who began investigating the serial suicides in Handam University of Science and Technology, along with Woo-jin, Jung-yeon, and Min-young. He becomes suspended due to his involvement with the case.
 Kim Joong-ki as Dr. Kim Kyu-chul
 He is the father of the twins Kim Woo-jin and Kim Bum-gyun (Kim Joon-hyuk). He is a neuroscientist specializing in treating trauma, working together with fellow neuroscientist Han Yong-woo, taking advantage of Byul's special memory-controlling technology.
 Shin Dam-soo as Detective Choi
 Detective Hong's junior who is working for another boss

Handam University people 

 Song Young-gyu as Han Yong-woo
 He is a professor and the dean of the Department of Neuroscience in Handam University of Science and Technology. He once worked together with Dr. Kim Kyu-chul in treating traumas using Byul's special technology. He became Byul's father a year after she came on Earth.
 Han Sang-jin as Park Dong-gun
 an associate professor of the Department of Neuroscience in Handam University of Science and Technology
 Shin Joo-hwan as Lee Hyun-suk
 a third-year student and research assistant in the Department of Neuroscience in Handam University of Science and Technology.

Part 2: A Great New World

Normal Earth people 

Kim Min-kyung as Dr. Park Min-young
 In 2037, she has become a skilled doctor and Joon-hyuk/Bum-gyun's girlfriend. She would always help him during investigations, especially in times when her expertise is needed.
 Seo Hyun-chul as Detective Hong Jin-hong
 He is reinstated in the police force as a member of the cybercrimes unit. In 2037, he helps Joon-hyuk in his investigations in Smart City.
 Oh Eui-shik as Lee Dong-soo
 Jung Joon-won as young Dong-soo (in Beta Project)
 a skilled hacker whom Joon-hyuk usually enlists during investigations. He was Woo-jin's former tutee.
 Kwon Hyuk-soo as Detective Oh

Smart Earth people 

 Min Sung-Wook as Lee Hyun-suk
 In 2037, he is now an employee in Human B
 Han Sang-jin as Park Dong-gun
 In 2037, he becomes the South Korea's Minister of Science and Economy
 Nam Myung-ryul as Yoon Hak-joo
 Mayor of Smart City
 Lee Hwa-kyum as Secretary Shin
 Choi Ji-hun as Kim Min-ji

Others 

 Cha Myung-wook as Park Jin-gyu
 Jeon Suk-kyung (Voice)
 Kang Chung-hoon (Voice)
 Ryu Eun-ji (Voice)
 Park Young-jae (Voice)
 Park Ji-a as Woman Waiting for Bus (Ep. 1, Part 2)
 Park Eun-ji
 Johyun as Announcer in A Great New World (Ep. 1)
 Jang Ji-woo as Smart City Security Agent (Ep. 1, Part 2)
 Jang Joo-hee
 Kim Sa-hee as Doctor in Smart City 
 Choi Sung-jae as Humans B Central Control Room Agent
 Kim Ji-sung as Kim Nan-hee
 Tae-ha as Choi Soo-bin (Ep. 3 and 7, Part 2)
Lee Ho-soo's deceased girlfriend.
 Ha Yoon-seo as Kang So-yoon
 Noh Haeng-ha
 Lee Tae-kyung as Section Chief Go

Original soundtrack

Part 1

Part 2

Ratings
In this table, the  represent the lowest ratings and the  represent the highest ratings.

Notes

References

External links 
 

TVN (South Korean TV channel) television dramas
South Korean science fiction television series
South Korean mystery television series
2017 South Korean television series debuts
Television series by Studio Dragon
Dystopian television series
Fiction set in 2017
Fiction set in 2037
Television series about extraterrestrial life
Television series about brothers
Fiction about memory erasure and alteration
Works about twin brothers
2017 South Korean television series endings
Television series set in the 2030s
Television series set in the 2010s